Anthis is a surname. Notable people with the surname include: 

Jacy Reese Anthis (born 1992), American writer
Rollen Henry Anthis (1915–1995), US Air Force major general